Giovanni Domenico de Cupis (Cupi, Cuppi) (1493–1553) was an Italian Cardinal, created by Pope Leo X in the consistory of 1 July 1517.

Biography
He was Crown-cardinal of the Kingdom of Scotland. He was a friend of Ignatius Loyola.

His mother was Lucrezia Normanni, who had had a daughter Felice della Rovere by Pope Julius II before marrying Bernardino de Cupis, Giovanni Domenico's father. He owed early advancement as Bishop of Trani to Julius.

He was Bishop of Albano in 1531, Bishop of Sabina in 1532, Bishop of Porto e Santa Rufina in 1535 and Bishop of Ostia in 1537. Dean of the College of Cardinals in 1541.

Notes

External links

1493 births
1553 deaths
16th-century Italian cardinals
Cardinal-bishops of Albano
Cardinal-bishops of Ostia
Cardinal-bishops of Porto
Cardinal-bishops of Sabina
Deans of the College of Cardinals
Place of birth missing
Archbishops of Trani
16th-century Italian Roman Catholic bishops